The bristle-nosed barbet (Gymnobucco peli) is a bird species in the family Lybiidae. It used to be placed in the family Bucconidae (puffbirds), which has been split up; alternatively, it may be included in a vastly expanded Ramphastidae (toucans).

Its range covers areas near the Gulf of Guinea (on either side of the Dahomey Gap), from eastern Sierra Leone to far northwestern Angola.

References

External links

Image at the Internet Bird Collection

bristle-nosed barbet
Birds of the African tropical rainforest
bristle-nosed barbet
Taxonomy articles created by Polbot